Ali Ghodsi is an Iranian-Swedish computer scientist and entrepreneur specializing in distributed systems and big data. He is a co-founder and CEO of Databricks and an adjunct professor at UC Berkeley. Ideas from his academic research in the area of resource management and scheduling and data caching have been applied in popular open source projects such as Apache Mesos, Apache Spark, and Apache Hadoop.

Ghodsi received his PhD from KTH Royal Institute of Technology in Sweden, advised by Seif Haridi. He was a co-founder of Peerialism AB, a Stockholm-based company developing peer-to-peer systems to transport and store data on the Internet. He was also an assistant professor at KTH from 2008 to 2009.

He joined UC Berkeley in 2009 as a visiting scholar and worked with Scott Shenker, Ion Stoica, Michael Franklin, and Matei Zaharia on research projects in distributed systems, database systems, and networking. During this period, he helped start Apache Mesos and Apache Spark projects. He also co-invented the concept of Dominant Resource Fairness, in a paper that heavily influenced resource management and scheduling design in distributed systems such as Hadoop.

In 2013, he co-founded Databricks, a company that commercializes Spark, and became chief executive in 2016.

References

Living people
Swedish computer scientists
University of California, Berkeley alumni
1978 births